Uranophora splendida is a moth in the subfamily Arctiinae. It was described by Gottlieb August Wilhelm Herrich-Schäffer in 1854. It is found in Colombia, Venezuela, French Guiana, Bolivia, and Brazil (particularly Rio de Janeiro).

References

Moths described in 1854
Euchromiina